The 2018 Cargill strike was an American protest held by employees of the Dayton, Virginia United States plant of Cargill, a poultry manufacturing corporation.

Background 
Plans of employees organizing and a union forming date back to late 2017 in the wake of reported employee abuse and poor working conditions at the plant. In November 2017, a solidarity community group, known as the Community Solidarity with Poultry Workers, formed in the wake of claimed employee abuse at Cargill. Specifically employees, and former employees claimed that the company would "dispose" of employees and not offer them proper health treatment.

In February 2018, it was reported that local activists and Cargill union organizers had filed a charge against Cargill for retaliation against their employees for forming and organizing. Within the charge, the organizing committees stated that within the prior six months Cargill had retaliated against four union supporters by terminating employment, denying overtime opportunities, assigning "less favorable jobs," and denying or reducing work opportunities and hours – "solely because of their union activities."

In response to terminated employees, the community of Dayton organized a series of protests during the Spring of 2018 to raise awareness of the strikes, and union organizing. The protests took place outside of the factory, but moved towards the parking lot as union leaders demanded to meet with plant leadership. In response the Dayton Police were dispatched and arrested nine protesters for trespassing on private property.

Reactions

Rockingham County 

The Dayton Police Department were dispatched and arrested nine individuals for protesting on private property.

Cargill 
Cargill denied that the protestors and organized workers had scheduled a meeting with the plant's leadership, and denied that they fired three employees for forming a union.

See also 
 Criticisms of Cargill

References

External links 

Cargill
Rockingham County, Virginia
2018 labor disputes and strikes
Labor disputes in the United States
Labor disputes in Virginia
2018 in Virginia
History of Virginia